Westfield Mall of the Netherlands is a shopping mall located in Leidschendam in the Netherlands.

History

Leidsenhage 1971–2017
November 21, 1969, marks the official start of the construction works for the shopping center known at the time as Leidsenhage. The official opening is on 23 September 1971.

Mall of the Netherlands
On 6 March 2014, the municipality of Leidschendam-Voorburg and owner Unibail-Rodamco-Westfield signed an agreement on the future of the Leidsenhage shopping centre. After elaboration of the plans, the renovation started in the autumn of 2016. The existing shopping center was demolished in phases and replaced by a new building.

Development and construction

Both the existing shells and the new buildings are connected by a façade with a white concrete top inspired by voile fabric, transforming itself along the building. The facade has been made of ultra-high-performance concrete. The simpler curved concrete panels are cast in adaptable steel moulds. The more complexly curved concrete panels are cast in moulds milled from large blocks of MDF.

The mall received a BREEAM excellent certification.

Opening
Westfield Mall of the Netherlands officially opened on 18 March 2021.

See also 
List of Unibail-Rodamco-Westfield properties

References

External links

 
 Unibail-Rodamco-Westfield

Shopping malls in the Netherlands
Shopping malls established in 1971
Shopping malls established in 2021
Mall of the Netherlands